= Argyronion =

Town of ancient Bithynia

Coordinates: 41°09′55″N 29°04′35″E

Argyronion was a coastal town of ancient Bithynia located on the Bosphorus.

Its site is located near Macar tabya in Asiatic Turkey.
